Brighton Rugby Club is one of the oldest rugby clubs in the country founded in 1868. As they were founded before the RFU they are one of the few clubs who are designated F.C. rather than R.F.C.

The club was formed mainly from players from Brighton College. The 1st XV play in London & SE Premier - a league at level 5 of the English rugby union system - following their promotion from London 1 South via the playoffs at the end of 2018-19. The 2nd XV play in Sussex Spitfire 1.

Honours
 Sussex 1 champions (2): 1991–92, 2008–09
 London 2 South East champions (2): 1999–00, 2012–13
 EDF Junior Vase winners: 2009
 RFU Senior Vase winners: 2010
 RFU Intermediate Cup winners: 2013
 London 1 (north v south) promotion play-off winners: 2018–19

References

English rugby union teams
Rugby clubs established in 1868
Sport in Brighton and Hove